Mary Burns (29 September 1821 – 7 January 1863) was a working-class Irish woman, best known as the lifelong partner of Friedrich Engels.

Burns lived in Salford, England. She met Engels during his first stay in Manchester, probably early in 1843. It is likely that Burns guided Engels through the region, showing him the worst districts of Salford and Manchester for his research for The Condition of the Working Class in England.

Mary Burns was the daughter of Michael Burns or Byrne, a dyer in a cotton mill, and of Mary Conroy. The family may have lived off Deansgate. She had a younger sister named Lydia (1827–1878), known as “Lizzie", and a niece named Mary Ellen Burns (born 1859), known as "Pumps".

After meeting in the 1840s, Burns and Engels formed a relationship that lasted until Burns' sudden death at the age of 41 on 7 January 1863. Although the custom of the day was marriage, the two politically opposed the bourgeois institution of marriage  and never married. After her death Engels lived with her sister Lizzie, whom he married on 11 September 1878, hours before her death.

Not much is written about Mary Burns. The only direct references to Mary Burns that have survived are a letter from Marx to Engels on learning of her death, saying she was "very good natured" and "witty", and a letter from Marx's daughter, Eleanor, saying she was "very pretty, witty and an altogether charming girl, but in later years drank to excess". No images of Burns are known to exist.

References

Karl Marx
1823 births
1863 deaths
Irish activists
Irish women activists
English activists
English women activists
People from Salford
English people of Irish descent
Friedrich Engels